Pardaleodes fan, the Ankole skipper, is a species of skipper in the family Hesperiidae. It is found in eastern Nigeria, Cameroon, the Democratic Republic of the Congo, Uganda, Rwanda, western Kenya, north-western Tanzania and Zambia. The habitat consists of forests and thick vegetation bordering streams. Some cultures use this insect in the cheese-making process.

The larvae feed on climbing grasses of the family Poaceae.

References

External links
Natural History Museum Lepidoptera genus database

Hesperiinae
Butterflies described in 1894
Butterflies of Africa